The Bermuda women's national football team is the national women's football team of Bermuda and is overseen by the Bermuda Football Association.

The first tournament that Bermuda was involved were in the 2005 Island Games held in Shetland, Scotland in where they won 5–0 to the host, also with Guernsey by 8–0 and lost 3–0 against the Faroe Islands, 1–0 with Åland and 2–1 against the Isle of Man, but even so they stayed with the bronze.

Its second tournament were the 2007 Island Games where they stayed with the bronze again.

Its third appearance was in the 2013 Island Games, where they played against Greenland and Hitra, beating them 5–1 and  6–1 in the group phase. It finally tied 0–0 against Greenland in the final, but it won 5–4 in penalties and stayed with the gold of that edition.

Results and fixtures

The following is a list of match results in the last 12 months, as well as any future matches that have been scheduled.

Legend

2022

Players

Current squad
The following players were called up for the match against Grenada on 12 April 2022.

Recent call ups

Competitive record

FIFA Women's World Cup

*Draws include knockout matches decided on penalty kicks.

Olympic Games

*Draws include knockout matches decided on penalty kicks.

CONCACAF W Championship

*Draws include knockout matches decided on penalty kicks.

CFU Women's Caribbean Cup

*Draws include knockout matches decided on penalty kicks.

Island Games

*Draws include knockout matches decided on penalty kicks.

See also
Sport in Bermuda
Football in Bermuda
Women's football in Bermuda
Bermuda men's national football team

References

External links
 Bermuda Football Association
 Team Profile at FIFA.com

Caribbean women's national association football teams
women